Calvin Wendell Bess is a former Bishop of Trinidad and Tobago.

Educated at  Codrington College, Barbados, he was ordained in 1966 and began his ecclesiastical career with a curacies at Scarborough, Tobago and Holy Trinity Cathedral in Port of Spain Next he was Priest in charge at Priest in Charge of St. Patrick's Church in Mt. Pleasant on Tobago before returning to Trinidad St. Paul's Church, San Fernando and then Holy Cross Church, Marabella, before his elevation to the episcopate in 2001 which he retired after ten years' service in 2011.

References

Living people
21st-century Anglican bishops in the Caribbean
Anglican bishops of Trinidad and Tobago
Alumni of Codrington College
Year of birth missing (living people)